"Cloud 9" is a song by English funk band Jamiroquai. It was released as the second single from their eighth studio album, Automaton, on 10 February 2017. The song peaked at number 19 in France, number 35 in Spain, and number 77 in Scotland.

Music video
The music video for "Cloud 9" was released on 22 February 2017. Directed by Charlie Lightening—director of the music video for the band's previous single, "Automaton"—the video was shot in Spain and stars band frontman Jay Kay alongside Mónica Cruz. Some of the scenes throughout the video have been noted as being similar to the work of Quentin Tarantino, and there are references to the music video for a past song by the band, "Cosmic Girl". The video was filmed at the Cabo de Gata, in Spain.

Track listing

Charts

References

2017 singles
2017 songs
Jamiroquai songs
Songs written by Jason Kay
Songs written by Matt Johnson (keyboardist)
Virgin EMI Records singles